Edward Cutbush (1772 – July 23, 1843) was born in Philadelphia. He graduated from the University of Pennsylvania in 1794, where he was resident physician of the Pennsylvania Hospital from 1790 to 1794. Cutbush was surgeon general of the Pennsylvania militia during the 1794 Whiskey Rebellion.

He was an officer and a surgeon in the United States Navy and was commissioned into office in 1799. Cutbush has been called the father of American naval medicine. He resigned from the Navy in 1829, after 30 years of service. During 1826, he was a professor of chemistry at Columbian College in the District of Columbia. In 1834, he relocated to Geneva, New York, where he founded Geneva Medical College, currently known as State University of New York Upstate Medical University. During his tenure there, he served as the first dean and professor of chemistry.

References

External links

 Penn Library: Smith Image Collection
 Naval Medicine in 1812. Mayer, Nancy
 The United States' naval chronicle, 1824
 Naval Register of 1826
 Penn's College and University Founders. Scott W. Hawley, 2002
 The Philadelphia medical and physical journal. Barton M.D., Benjamin Smith, 1808
 In Old Washington (Navy Yards), James Groggon Articles, Evening Star, November 12, 1910
 List of Officers, Dates of Commissions, and Length of Service at Sea Communicated to the House of Representatives, January 23, 1814

1772 births
1843 deaths
Hobart and William Smith Colleges people
University of Pennsylvania alumni
Physicians from Philadelphia
Educators from New York (state)
State University of New York Upstate Medical University faculty
People of colonial Pennsylvania
People of the Whiskey Rebellion
Physicians from Pennsylvania
Physicians from New York (state)
United States Navy Medical Corps officers